Welche is a little-spoken language of Alsace. A Lorrain dialect, it is closely related to French by the Oïl group. Its varieties include those of Bruche, Villé, Lièpvre, Kaysersberg and Orbey.

The name Welche is a French spelling of Welsh, a word from Germanic languages such as English, used originally to refer to Celtic speakers such as the Welsh, and later to Latin speakers after Latin was imposed on the Celts. The word Welsh has been adopted in Latin dialects (such as French) to refer exclusively to other Latin dialects (such as Welche). Welche, Welsh and English are all distantly related through the Indo-European group and language-mixing.

Vocabulary
Being close to German-speaking areas, a lot of words have been borrowed from German.

See also

 Language policy of France
 Names related to the word Welche

External links
 https://web.archive.org/web/00000000000000if_/http://juillot.home.cern.ch/juillot/ban_de_la_roche.html - variety of Ban de la Roche
 http://www.lapoutroie.fr/decouvrir/patois-welche.htm Welche patois 
 http://badonpierre.free.fr/salmpierre/tome3zf.html glossary 

Oïl languages